Live Without Sense is the first live album by German thrash metal band Destruction. It was released on January 1, 1989.

Track listing

Destruction
Destruction
Schmier – bass, vocals
Harry Wilkens – lead guitar
Mike Sifringer – rhythm guitar
Oliver "Olli" Kaiser – drums

Production
Joachim Luetke – cover illustration

References

Destruction (band) albums
1988 live albums
SPV/Steamhammer live albums
Live thrash metal albums